The 2008 New Delhi ITF Open, a women's tennis tournament within the 2008 ITF Women's Circuit, was the first and only edition of the tournament. The singles event was won by Ekaterina Dzehalevich of Belarus, an unseeded player, who defeated Yanina Wickmayer in the final with a score of 2-6, 6-3, 6-2. In the doubles final, the Chinese pair Ji Chunmei and Sun Shengnan defeated Sunitha Rao (India) and Aurélie Védy (France) by 2-6, 6-2 [10-4].

Singles event - details

Seeds

  Andreja Klepač (first round)
  Mathilde Johansson (second round)
  Vesna Manasieva (first round, retired)
  Yanina Wickmayer (final)
  Margit Rüütel (semifinals)
  Chanelle Scheepers (quarterfinals)
  Sunitha Rao (quarterfinals)
  Naomi Cavaday (semifinals)

Draw

Finals

Top half

Bottom half

References
 $50,000 New Delhi, International Tennis Federation

2008 ITF Women's Circuit
Sport in New Delhi
Tennis tournaments in India